Erebiomima is a genus of parasitic flies in the family Tachinidae. There are at least three described species in Erebiomima.

Species
These three species belong to the genus Erebiomima:
 Erebiomima hertingi Kugler, 1968
 Erebiomima luteisquama Mesnil, 1953
 Erebiomima moderata Herting, 1979

References

Further reading

 
 
 
 

Tachinidae
Articles created by Qbugbot